Texas City High School (TCHS) is a public high school in Texas City, Texas, in the Greater Houston area. It is one of two high schools in the Texas City Independent School District (TCISD), the other being La Marque High School.

The main school building for Texas City High opened in 1952. Another building for Texas City High opened in 1957, and the previous one became Blocker Junior High School.

, Texas City High School had 1,791 students.

Academics 
Texas City High School is ranked #11,174 in the National Rankings and ranked #1,036 within Texas, according to U.S. News & World Report. 58% of students are proficient in Reading, while 69% of students are proficient in Mathematics. TCHS' student graduation rate is 88%.

Athletics 
Texas City High School competes as a member of the University Interscholastic League who creates rules for and administers almost all athletic, musical, and academic contests for public primary and secondary schools in the U.S. state of Texas. Teams are called the "Stingarees" or "Stings" for short. Colors are Orange and Black. 

The school sponsors interscholastic teams for young men and women in Tennis, Track & Field, Cross Country, Swimming & Diving/Water Polo, Soccer, Powerlifting, and Basketball. Young women may compete in Volleyball and Softball, while young men may compete in Football, Wrestling, Golf, and Baseball.

Demographics 
The racial makeup of TCHS was 42% Hispanic, 32% Caucasian, 23% African American, 2% Mixed-Race, 1% Native American, 0.4 Asian American, and 0.3% Native Hawaiian/Pacific Islander.

Feeder patterns
Guajardo, Heights, Roosevelt-Wilson, and Kohfeldt elementaries, Levy-Fry Intermediate School, and Blocker Middle School feed into Texas City High.

Notable alumni
 Almighty Jay (formerly known as YBN Almighty Jay) professional rapper
Peso Peso, professional rapper

Nichole Cordova, professional singer
 Vernon Crawford, former NFL player
 Dion Dowell, former professional basketball player
 Charlie Dupre, former NFL player
 L. G. Dupre, former NFL player
 John Lee Hancock, film director and producer
 Max Hopper, former CIO Bank of America
Edie Patterson, actor and comedian
 Chuck Quilter, former NFL player
 Reggie Rusk, former NFL player
 Don Talbert, former NFL player
 Diron Talbert, former NFL player
 D'Onta Foreman, NFL player
 Chris Ballard, General Manager, Indianapolis Colts

References

External links
 
  (2014)
  (2004)

Texas City Independent School District high schools
1952 establishments in Texas
Educational institutions established in 1952